The FIS Alpine World Ski Championships 2015 were the 43rd FIS Alpine World Ski Championships, held from 2–15 February in the United States at Vail / Beaver Creek, Colorado.

Athletes from over 70 nations were expected, with a worldwide television audience of an estimated 1 billion and an onsite media and broadcast entourage of approximately 1,500. Competition began on Tuesday, February 3 and concluded on Sunday, February 15, covering 13 days and two weekends. There were five men’s and five women’s individual races, along with the nation’s team event, featuring a parallel giant slalom format. The team event was run at Vail and the other ten competitions at Beaver Creek, on or near the Birds of Prey course.

These were the third world championships for Vail / Beaver Creek, which previously hosted in 1989 and 1999. All the events in 1989 were held at Vail , and 1999 had events at both resorts, seven at Vail and three at Beaver Creek. Also in Colorado, Aspen hosted in 1950, which were the first championships held outside Europe, the first to include the giant slalom event, and the first alpine world ski championships outside the Olympics since 1939.

Host selection
All three finalists for 2015 had attempted to host the 2013 championships, which were awarded in 2008 to Austria.

The winner was selected at the FIS Congress in Antalya, Turkey, on June 3, 2010. Vail/Beaver Creek won in the first round with 8 votes to Cortina's 4 and St. Moritz's 3.

A new women's downhill course was built adjacent to the men's Birds of Prey course at Beaver Creek.

Schedule and course information
All times are local (UTC−7).

 The women's Super-G was delayed 30 minutes due to strong winds.
 The men's Super-G was postponed a day due to adverse weather conditions.

Medal winners

Men's events

Women's events

Team event

Medal table

 Host country highlighted.

References

External links
 
 FIS Site

 
FIS Alpine World Ski Championships
2015
FIS Alpine World Ski Championships
International sports competitions hosted by the United States
Alpine skiing competitions in the United States
2015 in sports in Colorado
February 2015 sports events in the United States
Sports competitions in Colorado
Skiing in Colombia